Olszewko  is a village in the administrative district of Gmina Nidzica, within Nidzica County, Warmian-Masurian Voivodeship, in Northern Poland.

References

Olszewko